A chicken fillet roll, also known as a hot chicken roll or chicken roll, is a baguette filled with a fillet of chicken. It is a ubiquitous deli item in Ireland, served at a wide variety of convenience shops, newsagents, supermarkets, petrol stations, fast food restaurants, and casual eateries throughout the country. It has been declared Ireland's favourite deli food. It is often cited as a hangover cure.

In addition to chicken, the roll may contain butter, mayonnaise, other condiments, lettuce, onion, cheese, stuffing, or potato wedges. Delis often offer a choice of chicken fillet breading, such as plain, spicy, or Southern-fried. Vegan chicken fillet rolls have also been available since 2021, using a plant-based meat substitute for the chicken.

See also

Breakfast roll
 Jambon

References

Fast food
Street food
Irish cuisine
National dishes
Hot sandwiches
Irish chicken dishes